Sequoia Economic Infrastructure Income Fund is a large British investment trust dedicated to the provision of debt instruments for infrastructure projects. Established in 2015, the company is a constituent of the FTSE 250 Index. The chairman is Robert Jennings and the Investment Advisor is Sequoia Investment Management Company in London.

References

External links
 Official site
 

Investment trusts of the United Kingdom
Financial services companies established in 2015
British companies established in 2015